"No Matter What Sign You Are" is a song released for Diana Ross & the Supremes by the Motown label.

Background
Originally intended to be Diana Ross & the Supremes' final single before the departure of Diana Ross and penned by Berry Gordy, the song failed to fulfil Gordy's expectations as the single did not reach the top 20 in either the US and UK, peaking at 31 and 37 respectively in July 1969. The song released as the third single from Let the Sunshine In. As with most singles released under this billing of the group, session singers perform the backing vocals on the recorded single as opposed to Supremes group members at the time, Mary Wilson and Cindy Birdsong.

Personnel
Lead vocals by Diana Ross
Background vocals by the Blackberries (Venetta Fields, Clydie King, and Sherlie Matthews)
Instrumentation by the Funk Brothers

Track listing
7" single (9 May 1969) (United States/United Kingdom/Netherlands)
"No Matter What Sign You Are" – 2:38
"The Young Folks" – 2:29

Chart history

Later versions and samples
It was recorded in 1983 by Russell Grant and the Starlettes.

It was sampled in 1989 by the Beastie Boys on "Shake Your Rump" from their acclaimed second album Paul's Boutique.

References

1969 singles
1969 songs
The Supremes songs
Songs written by Henry Cosby
Songs written by Berry Gordy
Song recordings produced by Berry Gordy
Song recordings produced by Henry Cosby
Psychedelic soul songs